MTV The Lair is a live television show aired on MTV Australia which showcases unsigned and breaking artists as well as high-profile international acts.

History
It was announced at the end of 2006 that MTV would launch a new live show in 2007 called MTV's The Lair which will air live every Thursday at The Metro Theatre in Sydney. The show launched on 26 January 2007.

Season 1

Episode 1
26 January 2007

The Lair Foreplay
 Jet
 Kasabian
 My Chemical Romance

The Lair (Live Show)
Peaches
Wolf & Cub
Spank Rock

Episode 2
1 February 2007
Die! Die! Die!
Dappled Cities Fly
Pomomofo
The Tongue
Little Birdy

Episode 3 (Special Episode)
8 February 2007
Evanescence

Episode 4
15 February 2007
Something for Kate
Children Collide
Bliss n Eso
Fait Accompli

Episode 5
22 February 2007
Juliette Lewis and the Licks
Behind Crimson Eyes
Expatriate
Bob Log III

Season 2

Episode 1 
19 June 2008
Shihad
Operator Please
Dangerous!
Catcall

Episode 2
26 June 2008
The Mess Hall
Youth Group
Van She
Snob Scrilla

Episode 3
3 July 2008

Episode 4 (special episode)
10 July 2008
Cypress Hill

Episode 5
17 July 2008
The Grates
Cog
Killaqueenz
The Sweatshop Boys
Streetparty

See also

 List of Australian music television shows

References

External links
 MTV's The Lair Official Website

MTV original programming
2007 Australian television series debuts